The statue of Saint Christopher is an outdoor sculpture by Emanuel Max, installed on the south side of the Charles Bridge in Prague, Czech Republic.

External links

 

Christian sculptures
Monuments and memorials in Prague
Sculptures of men in Prague
Statues on the Charles Bridge